The Western Fraternal Life Association, previously known as Zapadni Ceska Bratrska Jednota  is a fraternal benefit society and financial services organization in the United States. The association has its roots in the Czechoslovak immigrant community of the 19th century. It was once the second largest Czech-American freethought fraternity in the United States.

History 

The association was established in 1897 in Omaha, Nebraska by immigrants from Bohemia, as the Western Bohemian Fraternal Association (ZCBJ). The aim of the association, like other fraternal benefit societies, was to provide insurance and financial security for people from a similar demographic, in this case Czech immigrants to the United States, as well as protecting and promoting the Czech heritage of the members. The organization was a western offshoot of the Czech-Slovak Protective Society (CSPS), which was based in the eastern states. ZCBJ founder members disagreed with some CSPS policies which were not tailored to their specific circumstances, especially about the calculation of payments to members, and the admission of women to the club's services.

The motto of the society was "Truth, Love, and Loyalty", based on the purported values of the members and their community. In 1899, the association became one of the first fraternals to insure women. In 1919, members voted to insure juveniles. Membership was opened to all in 1947, and at the 1971 National Convention, members voted to change the name to the Western Fraternal Life Association.

Members created lodges in their areas to celebrate holidays, host plays and dances, and speak the Czech language. The lodges became a source of support and solidarity for members during difficult periods, such as the Great Depression and the World Wars.

, the association has more than 38,000 members from the states that Western is licensed in: California, Colorado, Illinois, Iowa, Kansas, Louisiana, Michigan, Minnesota, Nebraska, North Dakota, Ohio, Oklahoma, Oregon, South Dakota, Texas, Washington, and Wisconsin.

Organization 

The local units of the Association are called lodges, and the highest authority is the board of directors.

In 1923 the organisation's headquarters were at 307 12 Avenue, Cedar Rapids, Iowa.

Historic buildings

There are over a dozen historic buildings of the association which are listed on the U.S. National Register of Historic Places:

Notable lodges of the organization include:
ZCBJ Opera House (1903), Verdigre, Nebraska, NRHP-listed.
Z.C.B.J. Hall (1907), Arthur, Wisconsin, NRHP-listed.
ZCBJ Hall (1908), Tyndall, South Dakota, NRHP-listed.
Rad Slavin cis. 112 Z.C.B.J. Hall (1909), Comstock, Nebraska, NRHP-listed.
Lodge Zare Zapadu No. 44 (1909), Hayward Township in Freeborn County, Minnesota, NRHP-listed.
ZCBJ Hall (1910), Haugen, Wisconsin, NRHP-listed.
Rad Plzen cis. 9 Z.C.B.J. (SD10-6) (1911), Morse Bluff, Nebraska, NRHP-listed.
Z.C.B.J. Tolstoj Lodge No. 224 (1911), in Scio, Oregon, on the bank of Thomas Creek, NRHP-listed.
Z.C.B.J. Opera House (1913), Clarkson, Nebraska, NRHP-listed.
Z.C.B.J. Rad Tabor No. 74 (1914), Dorchester, Nebraska, NRHP-listed.
ZCBJ Lodge No. 46 (1917), Prague, Oklahoma, NRHP-listed.
Rad Jan Kollar cis 101 Z.C.B.J. (1921), Du Bois, Nebraska, NRHP-listed.
Western Bohemian Fraternal Union Hall (1925), Meadowlands, Minnesota, NRHP-listed.
Rad Saline Center cis. 389 Z.C.B.J. (1939), Western, Nebraska, NRHP-listed.
Lodge Boleslav Jablonsky No. 219, Poplar Grove Township, Minnesota, NRHP-listed.

See also 

American Czech and Slovak Association
Czech-Slovak Protective Society
List of North American ethnic and religious fraternal orders

References

External links 
Official website

Organizations established in 1897
Czech-American culture
 
Czech-American history
Slovak-American history
Diaspora organizations in the United States
Ethnic fraternal orders in the United States
Czech-Slovak Protective Society